This is a list of ecoregions in Peru.

Terrestrial
Peru is in the Neotropical realm. Ecoregions are listed by biome.

Tropical and subtropical moist broadleaf forests
 Bolivian Yungas
 Eastern Cordillera Real montane forests
 Iquitos várzea
 Napo moist forests
 Peruvian Yungas
 Solimões–Japurá moist forests
 Southwest Amazon moist forests
 Ucayali moist forests

Tropical and subtropical dry broadleaf forests

 Marañón dry forests
 Tumbes–Piura dry forests

Montane grasslands and shrublands
 Central Andean dry puna
 Central Andean puna
 Central Andean wet puna
 Cordillera Central páramo

Deserts and xeric shrublands
 Atacama desert
 Sechura desert

Mangroves
 Gulf of Guayaquil–Tumbes mangroves
 Piura mangroves

Marine
Peru is at the intersection of two marine realms, Temperate South America and the Tropical Eastern Pacific.

Temperate South America
 Central Peru
 Humboldtian

Tropical Eastern Pacific
 Guayaquil

References

 
ecoregions
Peru